Hannah Marie Einbinder (born May 21, 1995) is an American comedian, actress, and writer known for starring in the HBO Max series Hacks, for which she received nominations for two Primetime Emmy Awards, and a Golden Globe Award.

Early life and education 
Einbinder is the daughter of original Saturday Night Live cast member Laraine Newman and comedy writer Chad Einbinder. Her family is Jewish and she grew up in Los Angeles. Einbinder graduated from Beverly Hills High School and earned a Bachelor of Fine Arts degree in television writing and production from Chapman University.

Career 
In 2019, Einbinder appeared in the Just for Laughs festival's New Faces showcase and was named by National Public Radio as one of the 10 standout comedians to watch. She was also named one of Vulture's best new up and coming comedians to watch in 2019; she was recognized for "her refreshingly absurdist charm."

She made her national television debut in March 2020 on The Late Show with Stephen Colbert, and at the time was the youngest person to do a stand-up set on the show. It was the show's last on-stage stand-up performance for fifteen months as the COVID-19 pandemic was beginning.

In 2021, Einbinder co-starred as Ava in Hacks on HBO Max, together with Jean Smart and Carl Clemons-Hopkins. The show received a total of 15 Emmy nominations including acting nominations for Einbinder, Smart and Clemons-Hopkins. It was renewed for a second season in June 2021, which premiered on May 12, 2022.

Einbinder continues to perform stand-up comedy and is touring nationally during the summer of 2022.

Influences

Einbinder has cited Dana Gould, Janeane Garofalo, Bo Burnham, Maria Bamford, Sklar Brothers and Steve Martin as being among her inspirations and influences.

Personal life 
Einbinder is bisexual. She is in a relationship with stand-up comedian Alex Edelman.

Filmography

Film

Television

Awards and nominations

References

External links

1995 births
Living people
21st-century American actresses
21st-century American comedians
21st-century American Jews
American stand-up comedians
American television actresses
American women comedians
Actresses from Los Angeles
Bisexual actresses
American bisexual writers
Bisexual comedians
Bisexual Jews
Chapman University alumni
Comedians from Los Angeles County
Jewish American actresses
Jewish American female comedians
LGBT people from California